During his career Ibis the Invincible, a Fawcett Comics superhero with magical powers, has met many foes. Here are some of them.

Apollyon
Apollyon is the character who appeared in Whiz Comics #117 and is based on the homonymous demon in Christian lore. A demon who is summoned by a student called Brane who has found his magic book, he killed Professor Hertz who had it and used the magic to destroy his body. Ibis finds the Professor has disappeared, but is able to summon up his spirit and learn what has happened. Apollyon is summoned up and tries to crush Ibis with his tail, but Taia turns it to straw. Finally, he falls to the deepest fiery pit of Hades with the student and book taking Ibis with him, but Taia summons Ibis back to the world with the Ibistick and seals the pit. On another occasion he gave someone who loved Taia another Ibistick in exchange for his soul. The man died protecting Taia, but Ibis rescued his soul from Apollyon.

Black Rufe
A thuggish criminal who was hanged three hundred years before the story for brutal crimes. Karnok brings him back after stealing Charon's boat with Ra-Tuth and he stops Taia from getting the Ibistick when Ra-Tuth attacks Ibis. He tries using his great strength to kill Ibis, but Taia strikes him with lightning using the Ibistick, and his other associates are soon killed.

Black Pharaoh
Black Pharaoh is a sorcerous uncle of Ibis revived by the Sons of Set. The evil Pharaoh wanted to marry Taia, but could not as she was under the protection of Osiris, 'God of Justice'. An evil Priest who had been banished for using evil magic summoned the Underworld God Set who summoned up an army of demons to take over Egypt. Ibis rebelled and was imprisoned, but his uncle gave him the Ibistick. He used it to bring food, then escape. Ibis slew the Black Pharaoh when he tried to take Taia, but his love was wounded by an arrow she took for Ibis and put in a deep sleep that would last centuries.

The Cat
First appearing in Whiz Comics #89, The Cat is a being of great power who has a cult. The High priest of the Cult of the Great Cat has nine lives. Ibis first encounters the Cult when he meets a member who deserted the Cult. They are attacked by Cats, and despite Ibis summoning Cerberus to chase them away the man is killed. Ibis sees the dead cats become men. The Cat orders the High Priest to kill Ibis. The Priest dies when his knife turns to his heart in a fight with Ibis, but returns to life. He is killed again with the knife, but returns in Whiz Comics #89, swearing never to rest 'until Prince Ibis is eternally dead'. Ibis realises his nine lives after reading a book in Sanskrit, but is then attacked by a Jaguar, which he consumes with flame using the Ibistick, but it gives a human cry. The Great Cat tells him not to squander his lives and he makes another attack, getting into the apartment while Ibis and Taia are asleep using a rope to swing between buildings, where he covers Taia's mouth with his hand, then kidnaps her. Ibis discovers her missing and transports himself to who kidnapped her. He meets an old man who throws a cat at him, enabling him to snatch the Ibistick, with which he tries to blow Ibis to atoms, not realising its effects reverse if someone tries to destroy Ibis. Ibis transports himself to the Temple of the Cat in an equatorial jungle where Taia is about to be sacrificed to the Great Cat, and cat-like humanoids are present. He destroys the Temple and every living thing in it except for Taia and himself. The Great Cat, revealing itself as no mere monument, attacks them but Ibis turns it to ice and it starts melting. As the Great Cat has been destroyed, Cat-Man is also dead, as he drew his life from the Great Cat.

Charon
Charon is a boatman of the river Styx. In Whiz Comics #96 he is shown as an Old Man who is neither a hero nor villain. In #119 he is shown as a well-built middle-aged man. The story starts when a river bursts out next to a village, which washes two men away. The District Commissioner tells Ibis the locals won't use it, so Ibis should persuade them as he is a known master of white magic. Ibis gets there, but Taia sees the waters are black and the Ibistick vibrates, which it does in the presence of evil. Ibis worries about things coming out. Later that night, some boats sail along and from them emerge some figures, which include a three-headed dog, Cerberus. One of them reveals himself to be Charon, saying that Ibis sealed many of the entrances to his master's world, meaning he has made a new entrance. Ibis is disarmed and forced down by Cerberus, but Taia gets the Ibistick. However, her mouth is covered by Charon before she can use it, and Charon orders two men to throw her into the river. Ibis is able to defeat Cerberus, using a long tree-branch to knock all its three heads out. Charon says he knows Ibis cannot be directly hurt with the Ibistick, so he uses it to give himself the strength of a thousand men and tries to crush Ibis with a tree. Ibis is able to regain his Ibistick, restores Charon to normal, then binds him and Cerberus in unbreakable chains, before rescuing Taia. He then tells Charon to close this entrance off, and restore all those they had taken unlawfully. He then makes the river flow the other way, meaning the village can use it.

Dalaghar
The sorcerer of the Pharaoh who was stealing from the Pharaoh's treasury. When Ibis was charged by the Pharaoh to discover the thief and found him by making one of the swords lead him to the thief, he escaped to the Cavern of the Seven Statues and cast a spell to turn him into a stone statue, allowing him to fool Ibis who does not bother to count them. He is then sealed in there by an avalanche, while Ibis gets out with the stolen treasure. 4000 years later, the Seven Statues are discovered, although the archaeologist is curious as to why there are eight. He takes them to a museum and calls Ibis who is an expert on Egyptology, but Dalaghar escapes, causing Ibis to suspect him. Dalaghar feels cramped and is arrested for disturbing the peace by disrupting traffic, but escapes next day by becoming a statue, which is thrown out. Ibis finds him, but he takes the Ibistick and commands it to hit Ibis with a giant hammer, which instead hits him, breaking him like stone. Ibis reveals he was stone for so many years he was slowly turning to stone. Taia says that his death finally caught up with him after many years.

Gorgons
Based on the Gorgons Stheno and Euryale of Greek myth. Ibis goes to a town as apparently the Gorgons live in a cave nearby. He hears Henry Jones has disappeared while looking for his son who went into the cave, which the locals think is haunted. Ibis goes into the cave with a ball of string as it is a Labyrinth. The lamp goes out, so Ibis commands the Ibistick to glow like a beacon. They find a man turned to stone, however Taia is then turned to stone. The Gorgon tries to turn Ibis to stone, but Ibis creates magic spectacles to ward of her gaze. He then summons up the sword of Perseus, who killed one of the Gorgons centuries ago, and slays the snake the Gorgon, who calls herself Stheno, sets on him. He then throws the sword and kills Stheno, who calls on her sister to avenge her. A beautiful woman then appears and tells Ibis she was freed from the Gorgon's curse by it being killed. She then smashes the spectacles and her gaze starts turning Ibis to stone. Ibis is able to squeeze out some syllables, causing lightning to strike him and restore him to normal. He then commands the cave walls to close in on Euryale, crushing her to death. When the last Gorgon dies, her victims are restored to normal.

Hamed
Only appearing in Whiz Comics #3, Hamed is a local leader of bandits. After his men see Ibis create a new Thebes in Egypt, he decides to get the Ibistick. His men kidnap Taia. Ibis gets to the camp and turns the men into geese. He gets into Hamed's tent where Taia is bound and gagged. He turns Hamed into a pig, then returns with Taia.

Karnok
First appearing in Whiz Comics #90, Karnok is Master of Evil and leader of the School of Sorcerers. After they complete the Ninth Ritual, he tells them to bring a sacrifice to Fa-Lij, the God of Sorcerers. If it fails to please him the Offender will die. His most brilliant student Leku decides to bring Ibis killing him with a magic magnifying glass that focuses the sun's heat, but Ibis uses the Ibistick to cool the room and follows the offender. Karnok in anger casts a spell on Leku that will shrivel the flesh from his bones. His men seize the Ibistick and Karnok uses his magic to chain Ibis, planning to sacrifice him, cutting his heart out allowing Fa-Lij to claim his soul for Eternity. However, Leku in anger at Karnok and close to death throws the Ibistick to Ibis, who frees himself, stops the knife, and destroys the school, though Karnok escapes using his magic to transport himself away.

He next appears in #96, trying to bring people back from the dead, but fails, claiming he was planning to bring back Ra-Tuth and Black Rufe. He is attacked by Ibis whose Ibistick vibrates in the presence of evil. He kicks Ibis to slow him down, then runs away but is hit by a car and transported to the Underworld, where he knocks Charon out with his oar. He then takes Ra-Tuth and Black Rufe back in Charon's boat and they attack Ibis, but they are all killed and Ibis causes his Ibistick to make a pit that sends Karnok to 'the deepest pit of Hades'.

Moon-men
Thousands of years ago they competed with humanity for mastery of Earth, but lost and were banished to the Moon. Coincidentally Taia goes with Professor Letter (who has heard of them) to the Moon on a rocket ship the professor invented. Ibis transports himself to the ship and gives himself the power to survive in the vacuum of space. They find what appear to be statues of huge men made of white stone, but the Professor says these are the creatures, frozen, though the Iibistick vibrates in their presence. Some statues are taken back to the ship and revive, attacking the humans and killing Letter, but the ship crashes from friction, and the Moon-Men are killed in the fire.

Murder Malone
A crook who with other crooks takes over Boytown, a place for orphans, and forces them to work on Munitions to sell to the Axis Powers. Ibis receives a message that Boytown is in danger, so creates an airship called the Ibiship and travels there. He defeats the gang and creates a jail for Boytown, where Malone is imprisoned. However, Malone escapes. He binds and gags Taia and escapes in the Ibiship with her. Ibis creates another airship to follow them and finds the plane has crashed. He gets to Malone's base, where Taia is bound to a chair, but Ibis loses the Ibistick when attacked by Malone's henchmen and is handcuffed. Malone tries to use the Ibistick to turn Ibis into a toad but becomes one himself. Ibis then turns the other crooks into toads and leaves with Taia.

Ra-Tuth
An Egyptian Sorcerer who was brought back from the dead by Karnok with Black Rufe. He casts a spell which makes the Spirit of the Sphinx attack Ibis. Hearing Taia is being attacked by Black Rufe he uses the Ibistick to turn the Sphinx to stone. Black Rufe is killed and Ibis casts a spell which makes Karnok and Ra-Tuth fall to the Underworld. Soon they are doomed to wander for Eternity the bleak shores of the land of the dead.

Trug
Trug is oriental criminal who seeks magical powers, first by stealing the Ibistick. He becomes a recurring foe of Ibis. He wears a turban and suit but with stereotypical middle eastern features. He debuted in Whiz Comics #13.

Vampire Twins
Baron Ornzy and his sister Maryani are the vampire twins, debuting in Whiz Comics #101. While travelling on an ocean liner, their kills attract the attention of Prince Ibis and Taia. The Baron is killed when they try to kill Ibis and Taia (who sleep in separate rooms). The following issue, Maryani tries to avenge the death of her brother and calls forth an evil primeval spirit in the form of a great bat and briefly manages to get Ibis under her sway. However, she is slain when she tries to use the Ibistick against Ibis (she commands it to turn him into dust) and the spell is rebounded against her. Ibis then commands the stick to consume the bat in flame. A little curious about the name as it's very close to that of Baroness Orczy, the creator of the Scarlet Pimpernel.

Lists of DC Comics characters
 
Lists of DC Comics supervillains